USM Blida is an association football club based in Blida, Algeria. USM Blida played their first league fixture on 13 September 1964 against ASM Oran. Since that game they have played in 750 first league matches and have faced 50 different sides. Their most regular opponents have been CR Belouizdad, whom they have played against on 50 occasions.

The team that USM Blida have met the most in Algerian Ligue is CR Belouizdad with 50 matches. USMB have won 15 of the league matches against ES Sétif, which represents the most USM Blida have won against any team. USM Blida have drawn 18 matches with MC Oran more than any other team. CR Belouizdad and MC Alger defeated USM Blida on 23 occasions, which represents the most USM Blida have lost against any club.

Key
The records include the results of matches played in the Algerian Championnat National (from 1964 to 2010) and the Algerian Ligue Professionnelle 1 (since 2010).
  Teams with this background and symbol in the "Club" column are competing in the 2017–18 Algerian Ligue Professionnelle 1 alongside USM Blida.
  Clubs with this background and symbol in the "Club" column are defunct.
P = matches played; W = matches won; D = matches drawn; L = matches lost; F = Goals scored; A = Goals conceded; Win% = percentage of total matches won

All-time league record

Algerian Ligue Professionnelle 1

Overall record
Statistics correct as of game against USM Alger on May 19, 2018

References
General
 

League Record By Opponent
USM Blida